Angelo J. Arculeo (18 February 1924 – 9 March 2013) was an Italian American accountant, lawyer, and Republican Party politician from New York City who represented parts of southern Brooklyn in the New York City Council from 1962 to 1982. He served as Minority Leader of that body twice, from 1962 to 1970, and from 1973 to 1982. During the period between his two terms as Minority Leader he continued to serve as Republican Party Leader.

A 1954 graduate of St. John's University School of Law,

Arculeo is interred at St. John Cemetery, Queens, New York.

References 

1924 births
2013 deaths
American accountants
New York City Council members
New York (state) Republicans
Politicians from Brooklyn
St. John's University (New York City) alumni
United States Army soldiers
Burials at St. John's Cemetery (Queens)
20th-century American lawyers